Kate Normington is a South African actress, singer, and songwriter. Normington first rose to national prominence playing Sister Mary Amnesia in the Alhambra Theatre's production of Nunsense in 1987, and has appeared on the West End and South African stage, and in local and international film and television productions.

Early life 
Normington grew up in Johannesburg, South Africa and attended Pretoria Girls' High School and Marist Brothers Observatory (Sacred Heart College). She studied Speech and Drama at the University of the Witwatersrand, graduating in 1987.

Career

Theatre

Career beginnings 
After performing as a cabaret singer at Piaf in Johannesburg (alongside Didi Kriel), Normington's first professional role was in Tarts, by Kevin Feather, at La Parisienne Theatre in Johannesburg. This was followed by her breakthrough role playing Sister Mary Amnesia in Tobie Cronje's production of Nunsense at the Alhambra Theatre in 1987, which garnered Normington her first Fleur du Cap Award for Best Actress in a Musical. She followed this successful turn with the Trilogy of '87 at the Durban Playhouse, where she performed a triple role as Joanna in Sweeney Todd, Niki in Sweet Charity, and also appeared in Candide, in a cycle in which all three productions were staged on the same day, one after the other.

In 1989, Normington was cast as Guinevere in the State Theatre's production of Camelot, understudied by Gaynor Young. The production became infamous when, replacing Normington in December, Young fell down an unguarded lift shaft while on stage, landing on concrete 5 storeys below and going into a coma for 5 weeks.

Throughout the late '80s and early '90s, Normington was in several successful and high-profile shows across South Africa, including playing Josephine in Romance Romance, Eliza in My Fair Lady in 1990, and Janet in The Rocky Horror Show in 1993; appearing in A Touch of Webber... A Taste of Rice, an original show by Richard Loring, in 1991; and playing Sheila in Janice Honeyman's production of Hair, one of the first in South Africa following its unbanning, at the Civic Theatre in 1994.

The West End and the UK 
In 1993, Normington left for England to pursue her career on international stages. Her first job in London was in the West End production of Sunset Boulevard in its initial run in 1993, which featured Patti LuPone as Norma Desmond, in which Normington understudied the role of Betty Schaefer. After encountering some passport trouble, she was forced to return home to South Africa, appearing in Tell Me On A Sunday in 1994, before she was able to return to England. Upon her return, Normington returned to the cast of Sunset Boulevard at the Adelphi Theatre, understudying Betty Buckley, Elaine Paige, and Petula Clark for the role of Norma Desmond, appearing in the role on one occasion.

After leaving Sunset Boulevard, Normington appeared in a regional production of Aspects of Love in Hampshire in 1996, playing Rose Vibert, and then played the Baker's Wife in Into the Woods in Leicester in 1997.

In 1998, Normington returned to the West End as Grace Farrell in the revival of Annie at the Victoria Palace, continuing to play the role after the show went on tour in February 1999. She toured with the show for over a year until it ended in Oxford in 2000, after which she returned to South Africa.

Return to South Africa 
She appeared as Miss Bell in Fame in 2002, and as "Soapstar" in Hazel Feldman and Pieter Toerien's production of Menopause - The Musical in 2004. This was followed by a trio of award-winning performances, as Normington received a Naledi Award for her 2006 one-woman show Bombshells, her 2007 performance as Velma von Tussle in the Lyric Theatre production of Hairspray - also starring Mara Louw and Harry Sideropolous - and for her 2010 appearance as Tanya in Mamma Mia!. She also starred as Miss Darbus in the highly publicized production of High School Musical on Stage in 2008, which produced a star in Carmen Pretorius after a televised talent search program: High School Musical: Spotlight South Africa.

The 2010s saw a series of smaller shows to go along with her customary large production musicals, as Normington performed in Nora Ephron's Love, Loss, and What I Wore in 2011, and appeared in Two in the Bush, a comedy sketch show she wrote and co-devised with Jaci de Villiers, at the Auto & General Theatre on the Square in 2014. Normington also starred in the Market Theatre's production of Pirandello's Six Characters In Search of an Author in 2015.

Normington did not, however, take a break from big budget musicals in this time, starring as Fraulein Kost in 2012's Cabaret, Mother Superior in the Nelson Mandela Theatre's Sister Act in 2015, Mrs Brice in the Fugard Theatre's 2017 production of Funny Girl, as well as Mrs White in Marc Lottering's Aunty Merle: The Musical, and Liz Essendine in Present Laughter at the Theatre on the Bay. 2016 also saw Normington appear in her first pantomime at the Nelson Mandela Theatre, playing Aunt Silly in Janice Honeyman's Babes in the Woods.

More recently, Normington has had several star turns, as Mrs Shears and various other characters in The Curious Incident Of The Dog In the Night Time in 2018, as The Witch in PTP's Into the Woods in Cape Town and Johannesburg in 2019 (a role for which she was nominated for both Fleur du Cap and Naledi Awards), and as the Narrator in The Rocky Horror Show in 2020.

Film and Television 
Normington has appeared in several films over the course of her career, starting with 1991's The Sheltering Desert, in which she appeared alongside Gavin Hood and Rupert Graves, which was followed by Brendan Pollecutt's Hey Boy in 2003. She also appeared in a short from the NFVN, entitled The Last Doorman, as well as starring in Angus Buchan's Ordinary People in 2006. More recently, Normington appeared in the Netflix film The Last Days of American Crime, starring Edgar Ramirez.

Normington has also had a long and varied television career, appearing in many popular South African programs, such as Scandal, Shado's, Hard Copy, 7de Laan, The Lab, Backstage, and The Res. She received a SAFTA nomination for her work on Tim Greene's Those Who Can't in 2017, and played Pam Henshaw in SABC 3's High Rollers. Also in 2017, she gained critical acclaim for her appearance in Julia Anastosopoulos's Tali's Wedding Diary, as Michelle, the title character's mother. Normington also appeared in three episodes of MNet's Still Breathing alongside Siv Ngesi, Michael Richard, and Dorothy Ann Gould.

Music 
Normington has also released two solo albums, Mother's Daughter - for which she wrote six original tracks - and a recording of Tell Me On a Sunday, the first act of Andrew Lloyd Webber's Song and Dance.

Theatre

Filmography

Film

Television

Discography 

 Mother's Daughter (2001)
 Tell Me On a Sunday (1994)

Awards and nominations

Theatre

Television

References 

People from Johannesburg
South African actresses
University of the Witwatersrand alumni
Year of birth missing (living people)
Living people